The 1900 Italian Football Championship was the third edition of the Italian Football Championship. It was won by Genoa, their third consecutive titles.

Qualifications

Piedmont
Final classification

Results

Liguria

|}

Lombardy
Milan was the only registered team. The team was admitted directly to Round 2.

Semi-final
Played on 15 April

|}

Final
Played on 22 April in Turin

|}

References and sources
Almanacco Illustrato del Calcio - La Storia 1898-2004, Panini Edizioni, Modena, September 2005

1900
1899–1900 in European association football leagues
1899–1900 in Italian football